This is a list of Internet companies by revenue and market capitalization. The list is limited to dot-com companies, defined as a company that does the majority of its business on the Internet, with annual revenues exceeding US$1 billion. It excludes Internet service providers or other information technology companies. For a more general list of technology companies, see list of largest technology companies by revenue. This list is incomplete and does not include some dot-com companies acquired by incumbent brick and mortar firms to expand the distribution channels.

List

See also
 List of largest technology companies by revenue
 List of largest manufacturing companies by revenue
 List of largest companies by revenue
 List of largest United States–based employers globally
 List of largest employers
 Economy of the United States

References

Internet
Economy-related lists of superlatives
Internet
Companies